Michelle Emilie Rouillard Estrada (born October 28, 1986) is a Colombian beauty pageant titleholder, model, and actress who was crowned Miss Colombia 2008. As Miss Colombia, Rouillard represented Colombia at Miss Universe 2009, where he ended up without any placement.

Early life
Rouillard was born in Popayan, Cauca, Colombia to a French father, Patrick Rouillard and Colombian mother ,María del Mar Estrada. Within her studies, it stands out that she is a professional in International Business from Concordia University in Montreal, Canada. In addition to her native language, Spanish, she also speaks English and French. She also studied acting her first role as an actress was in the telenovela La teacher de Inglés. As for her career as a model, she has participated in different catwalks, she is part of the stock models agency.

Michelle has shown herself as an admirer and practitioner of the esoteric arts and astrology, in January 2022 I assure you that she is a specialist in Vedic astrology and that since she was a child she felt a great inclination for esotericism and also being very young she made the astral chart, Curiously, he remembers that nothing that was read to him became reality.

Pageantry

Miss Colombia 2008

On November 17, 2008, Rouillard represented her native Cauca department in the Miss Colombia 2008 held at the Barahona Auditorium, Julio César Turbay Convention Center, Cartagena, Bolívar.

During the special award ceremony she received the special award, Miss Photogenic.

Miss Universe 2009

Rouillard represented Colombia in the Miss Universe 2009 pageant.

that was held on August 23, 2009 in Nassau, Bahamas, where she did not qualify for the final phase.

References

External links
Profile for Miss Colombia website

1986 births
Living people
Colombian people of French descent
Miss Colombia winners
Miss Universe 2009 contestants
Colombian beauty pageant winners